Diabetes Technology Society (DTS) is a nonprofit organization that promotes the use of new technology to assist patients living with diabetes.

Founded
It was established in 2001 by David C. Klonoff (Mills Peninsula Health Services).

Activities
DTS is responsible for organizing three scientific conferences each year. They are: 
 Diabetes Technology Meeting 
 Clinical Diabetes Technology Meeting 
 European Clinical Diabetes Technology Meeting

Some of the educational objectives discussed during these conferences include:
 The understanding of cybersecurity and its relation to the medical device industry, specifically diabetes devices
 Discuss Continuous glucose monitor and their benefits in comparison to self-monitoring of blood glucose
 Go over the new technology being implemented to help in the release of the Artificial pancreas into the market
 Identify new insulin products (like Inhaled insulin, biosimilar insulin, glucose responsive insulin). Also, discuss how global warming has an effect on insulin stability
 Successfully understand how mobile apps could benefit managing diabetes
 Go over insulin pump therapy
 Discuss social media and its effects on benefiting managing diabetes
 Identify the new treatments available in the market for "Diabetic foot" and go over future treatments for diabetic limb salvage and prevention

Achievements
In 2013, DTS gained support from the Food and Drug Administration for a proposed post-market surveillance system to test the accuracy and quality of self-monitoring of blood glucose systems. In 2014, they launched the surveillance program.

Publishing
The bi-monthly peer-reviewed medical journal, Journal of Diabetes Science and Technology, is published by SAGE Publications on behalf of Diabetes Technology Society.

References

Diabetes organizations
Organizations established in 2001